Fonografika Sp. j. is the largest independent Polish record label, it was founded in 2001 by Jacek Caba, which he actively ran until 2014.

The label is accredited with the rise of Hip-Hop in Poland and has over the years given a push the majority of Hip Hop releases in Poland. However, since its foundation the label released albums in many genres; hip-hop, pop, pop rock, heavy metal, jazz and classical music. In total the catalogue comprises some 5000 releases, some of which are: Hanna Banaszak, Made of Hate, Mandaryna, Normalsi, Peja, Slums Attack, Skaldowie, TZN Xenna, Vesania, Apteka, Maria Sadowska and Rootwater.

Fonografika over the years gave a start and distributed labels such as Karrot Kommando, Tone Industria, Artgraff, RPS Enterteyment, Spółdzielnia, Slang Records, INNI Pro, ZKW Atrakcja, Aloha Entertainment, Klin Records, Embryo Nagrania, Szpadyzor Records, Respekt Records, Labirynt Records, Rapton Records, Hemp Rec., Entyrecords LTD, Media Solution Tune Project, Kim Hellmedia, Urban Rec, Alkopoligamia, Reformat4 Records, Step Records, Ganja Mafia Label, Sto Procent, Iberia Records, Penguin Records, Pawlik Relations, and Prosto among others.

In 2014 the label became a subject of criticism based on lack of payouts to artists Flint, Guova and Kajman. Contrary to the popular belief those artists were not signed to the label. However Fonografika distributed the smaller labels (Juicey Juice Nagrania, Onit and Rapton Records) who were responsible and released the albums of the artist who made the public complaint. Later the artists wrote an open apology to Fonografika and the issue was put to rest.

Artists

Current

 3Y
 52UM
 Alicetea
 Bakshish
 Barbara Stępniak-Wilk
 Bezsensu
 Bayer Full
 Chilitoy
 Ciryam
 DJ 600V
 DJ Decks
 Filip Sojka
 Hanna Banaszak
 Justyna Panfilewicz
 Hedfirst
 Krzysztof Jaryczewski
 Letni, Chamski Podryw
 Lostbone
 Made of Hate
 MadMajk
Masturbathor
 Mind Kampf
 Normalsi
 Oktawia Kawęcka
 Peja
 Scream Maker
 Slums Attack 
 Shoom
 Styl V.I.P.
 TZN Xenna
 Vesania (Poland only)
 Weekend
 Wojtczak/Mazolewski/Gos
 Zbigniew Wodecki
 Zebra

Former

 2cztery7 (disbanded)
 4P & Onil
 Analog (disbanded)
 Apteka
 Balkan Electrique
 Bosski Roman
 Bracia 
 Deuter
 Dono
 Dreamland
 Emo
 Erijef Massiv
 Fatum Crew
 Firma
 Funky Filon 
 Hudy HZD
 Hurragun
 Kabanos
 KaRRamBa 
 Kuba Stankiewicz
 KS76
 KrzyHu & NWS
 Mandaryna
 Lukasyno
 Lukasyno & Kriso
 Małpa N.A.S.
 Mały Esz Esz
 Maria Sadowska
 Medi Top Glon 
 Molesta Ewenement
 Mollęda
 Moral & Gano 
 Mroku
 MyNieMy
 Nagły Atak Spawacza
 Neuronia
 Obóz TA (disbanded) 
 Paluch
 Pi eR Dwa (πR2) (disbanded)  
 Rootwater (disbanded)
 S2O
 Siła Dźwięq
 Skaldowie 
 Slim Motion
 Testor
 Tewu
 V.E.T.O.

References

External links

Polish independent record labels
Mass media companies established in 2001
2001 establishments in Poland
Polish companies established in 2001